Claudia M. Balducci (born September 24, 1967) is an American politician from the state of Washington. She is the Chair of the King County Council, representing District 6. She previously served as the mayor of Bellevue, Washington.

Education 
Balducci earned a Bachelor of Arts from Providence College and a Juris Doctor from Columbia Law School.

Career 
After graduating from law school, Balducci worked as a labor negotiator in Lake Hills, Bellevue. She has also worked as a leader in the areas of affordable housing, education, and transportation. Balducci was first elected to the Bellevue City Council in 2004. She served as deputy mayor of Bellevue from 2008 to 2009, and while working as the Director of the Department of Adult and Juvenile Detention for King County, was elected mayor of Bellevue in 2014. During her tenure as mayor, Bellevue was selected to participate  in a Bloomberg Philanthropies initiative to use data to enhance the distribution of public services. While serving as mayor, Balducci announced her candidacy for King County Council.

After endorsements that included U.S. Senators Patty Murray and Maria Cantwell, Governor Jay Inslee and King County Executive Dow Constantine, Balducci defeated six-term incumbent Jane Hague in the 2015 election to the King County Council. After her re-election to a second term on the county council, she was unanimously elected to serve as Chair of the council in 2020. She is the first woman to serve as council chair since 2008.

During her tenure as Chair of the King County Council, she has addressed the local deployment of COVID-19 vaccines, homelessness and housing issues, and law enforcement reform. In 2020, she proposed  the director of the Office of Law Enforcement Oversight (OLEO) not be reappointed, which was successful after a council vote. In 2021, she sponsored a proposal to create a "first-in-the-nation" program to support undocumented immigrants with applications for status and citizenship that was approved by the King County Council.

In 2021, in addition to her role as Chair of the King County Council, she was elected president of the Puget Sound Regional Council, after previously serving as vice-president, and she has served as Chair of the Sound Transit System Expansion Committee.

Honors and awards
 2015 Warren G. Magnuson Elected Official of the Year Award, Washington State Democratic Party

Personal life 
In 2009, Balducci and her husband adopted a child from Kazakhstan.

References

External links

Living people
Washington (state) Democrats
People from Bellevue, Washington
King County Councillors
Mayors of places in Washington (state)
Providence College alumni
Columbia Law School alumni
1967 births